Wazobia 95.1 FM Kano is a  Nigerian Pidgin English radio station in Kano state. It was founded in 2007 and belongs to Globe Communications Limited.

Wazobia Fm Kano is known for its humorous approach to broadcasting. The radio station airs a mixture of news, features, sport, music (from popular Nigerian music, hip hop, highlife to world music and reggae), talk shows, topical issues and interviews.

Shows 

 Una Wake up Show
 Oga Madam Office
 Evening Oyoyo
 Satide Jollification
 Satide Waka
 Satide Mende Mende
 Sunday Jollification
 Sunday Waka
 Sunday Mende Mende

OAP's

 OcheDeKing
 Tin Tomato
 Oyibo Daddy
 Gymnastic
 Princess
 MVP
 Verse

See also 

 List of radio stations in Nigeria
 Media of Nigeria
 Wazobia FM Lagos
 Wazobia Fm Onitsha
 Wazobia FM Port harcourt

References

External links
 

Radio stations in Nigeria
Radio stations in Kano
2007 establishments in Nigeria
Radio stations established in 2007
Privately held companies of Nigeria
World music radio stations
Wazobia FM